Dobson Dome is a prominent snow-covered, dome-shaped mountain  high between Rohss Bay and Croft Bay, in the northern portion of James Ross Island. It was surveyed by the Falkland Islands Dependencies Survey of 1958–61, and it was named by the UK Antarctic Place-Names Committee for Alban Dobson (1885–1962), a British civil servant who was Secretary of the International Whaling Commission from 1949–59 and President of the International Council for the Exploration of the Sea from 1952–55.

Dobson Dome is described as a basalt tuya in the Encyclopedia of Quaternary Science. It is part of the James Ross Island Volcanic Group.

References 

Mountains of Graham Land
Landforms of James Ross Island
Tuyas of Antarctica
Quaternary volcanoes
Volcanoes of Graham Land